The Liberal Democratic Party of Belarus, or ЛДПБ (LDPB), is a political party in Belarus. It was created in 1994 as the Belarusian successor of the Liberal Democratic Party of the Soviet Union.

Despite claiming to be a "constructive and democratic opposition" the party de facto supports the current president, Alexander Lukashenko (much like the Liberal Democratic Party of Russia with Vladimir Putin).

In the legislative elections, 13–17 October 2004, the party won 1 out of 110 seats. Its candidate in the presidential election of 2006, Sergei Gaidukevich, won 3.5% of the vote.

Party leader Gaidukevich was a member of the House of Representatives from 2004 to 2008. He was later a member of the Council of the Republic from 2016 to 2019.

Ideology 
Despite the name, the party does not support liberalism or liberal democracy. Rather, according to political scientist Pippa Norris, the LDPB is an extremist party, dedicated to restoring the Soviet Union, and thus supports Russian-Belarusian unionism. The party is opposed to NATO, the European Union and what it calls "international monopolies". It gathers its main support from ex-servicemen and those bent on restoring the Soviet Union; it is especially strong in Minsk, Vitebsk and some other regional cities.

The LDPB has no democratic structure and was run by Sergei Gaidukevich from 1994 to 2019, when he was succeeded by his son Oleg Gaidukevich. Its main domestic ally is the Belarusian Patriotic Party.

Election results

Presidential elections

Legislative elections

See also
Liberal Democratic Party of Pridnestrovie
Liberal Democratic Party of Russia
Liberal Democratic Party of Ukraine
Union of Russia and Belarus

References

External links
 
Old website

1994 establishments in Belarus
Pan-Slavism
Parties affiliated with the Liberal Democratic Party of Russia
Political parties established in 1994
Political parties in Belarus
Right-wing populism in Belarus
Right-wing populist parties
Conservative parties in Belarus
Right-wing parties in Europe
Right-wing politics in Belarus
Belarusian nationalism